Jürgen Mittelstraß (born 11 October 1936 in Düsseldorf) is a German philosopher especially interested in the philosophy of science.

Career
Mittelstraß studied philosophy, history and protestant theology at the universities of Bonn, Erlangen, Hamburg and Oxford from 1956 until 1961. He received his Ph.D. from the University of Erlangen in 1961, where he afterwards wrote his habilitation, completing in 1968. He was influenced by the Erlanger Konstruktivismus.

In 1970 Mittelstraß became a professor of philosophy in the University of Konstanz and from 1970 to 2005 he was a full professor of philosophy of science at Konstanz. 

He is the editor of the Enzyklopädie Philosophie und Wissenschaftstheorie (4 volumes, 1980–1996; second edition 2005-2018, 8 volumes).

Academic recognition
Mittelstraß is member of numerous scientific and philosophical societies and has received several awards. He has been awarded honorary doctorates from six universities, the Humboldt University of Berlin, the Berlin Institute of Technology, the Universities of Pittsburgh, Iaşi, Duisburg-Essen and the Tartu. 

He is a member of the Berlin-Brandenburg Academy of Sciences and Humanities, the Pontifical Academy of Sciences and the Academia Europaea (1988).

Private life
Mittelstraß is married and has four daughters.

Awards
 Gottfried Wilhelm Leibniz Prize (German Research Foundation, 1989)
 Order of Merit of the State of Berlin (1993)
 Merit Cross 1st Class of the Order of Merit of the Federal Republic of Germany (Verdienstkreuz 1. Klasse) (1999)
 Arthur Burkhardt Prize (1992)
 Lorenz Oken Medal (Society of German Scientists and Physicians, 1998)
 Award of the Dr. Margrit Egnér Foundation (2000)
 Werner Heisenberg Medal (Alexander von Humboldt Foundation, 2000)
 Bavarian Order of Merit (2006)
 Austrian Cross of Honour for Science and Art, 1st class (2011)
 Nicholas Rescher Prize for Systematic Philosophy (University of Pittsburgh, 2012)

Major works
 Die Rettung der Phänomene (1962, Dissertation)
 Neuzeit und Aufklärung (1970)
 Die Möglichkeit von Wissenschaft (1974)
 Wissenschaft als Lebensform (1982, 
 Der Flug der Eule (1989)
 Die unzeitgemäße Universität (1994)
 Die Häuser des Wissens (1998)
 Wissen und Grenzen (2001)
 Wem gehört das Sterben?, in: Robertson-von Trotha, Caroline Y. (ed.): Tod und Sterben in der Gegenwartsgesellschaft. Eine interdisziplinäre Auseinandersetzung [= Kulturwissenschaft interdisziplinär/Interdisciplinary Studies on Culture and Society, Vol. 3] (2008)

References

External links 

 
 Homepage von Mittelstraß
 Article 'On Transdisciplinarity' at the website of the Holy See

1936 births
Living people
Writers from Düsseldorf
German philosophers
University of Bonn alumni
University of Erlangen-Nuremberg alumni
University of Hamburg alumni
Alumni of the University of Oxford
Academic staff of the University of Konstanz
Members of Academia Europaea
Members of the Pontifical Academy of Sciences
Members of the Austrian Academy of Sciences
Transdisciplinarity
Philosophers of science
Gottfried Wilhelm Leibniz Prize winners
Officers Crosses of the Order of Merit of the Federal Republic of Germany
Recipients of the Order of Merit of Berlin
Recipients of the Austrian Cross of Honour for Science and Art, 1st class